Anne-Geneviève de Bourbon (28 August 16195 April 1679) was a French princess who is remembered for her beauty and amours, her influence during the civil wars of the Fronde, and her final conversion to Jansenism.

Biography

Early life
Anne Geneviève was the only daughter of Henri de Bourbon, Prince of Condé, and his wife Charlotte Marguerite de Montmorency, and the sister of Louis, Grand Condé. She was born in the prison of the Château of Vincennes into which her father and mother had been thrown for opposition to Marshal d'Ancre, the favourite of Marie de' Medici, who was then regent during the minority of Louis XIII.

She was educated with great strictness in the convent of the Carmelites in the Rue Saint-Jacques in Paris. Her early years were clouded by the execution of Henri of Montmorency, her mother's only brother, for intriguing against Richelieu in 1632, and that of her mother's cousin the Count François de Montmorency-Bouteville for duelling in 1635; but her parents made their peace with Richelieu, and being introduced into society in 1635 she soon became one of the stars of the Hôtel de Rambouillet, at that time the center of all that was learned, witty, and gay in France.

"The Goddess of Peace and Concord"

In 1642, she was married to Henri II d'Orléans, Duke of Longueville, governor of Normandy, a widower twice her age (his first wife Louise de Bourbon had died in 1637). The marriage was not happy. After Richelieu's death, her father became chief of the council of regency during the minority of Louis XIV, her brother Louis won the great victory of Rocroi in 1643, and the duchess became of political importance. In 1646, she accompanied her husband to Münster, where he was sent by Mazarin as chief envoy, and where she charmed the German diplomats who were negotiating the treaty of Westphalia and was addressed as the "goddess of peace and concord".

La Fronde
On her return, she fell in love with the Duke of La Rochefoucauld, the author of the Maxims, who made use of her love to obtain influence over her brother, and thus win honors for himself. She was the guiding spirit of the first Fronde, when she brought over Armand de Bourbon, Prince de Conti, her second brother, and her husband to the malcontents, but she failed to attract Condé himself, whose loyalty to the court overthrew the first Fronde. It was during the first Fronde that she lived at the Hôtel de Ville and took the city of Paris as godmother for the child born to her there. The peace did not satisfy her, although La Rochefoucauld won the titles he desired. The second Fronde was largely her work, and in it she played the most prominent part in attracting to the rebels first Condé and later Turenne. In the last year of the war, she was accompanied into Aquitaine by the Duke of Nemours, an intimacy which gave La Rochefoucauld an excuse for abandoning her, and to immediately return to his former mistress the duchesse de Chevreuse.

Jansenism: a Refuge from Disgrace
Thus abandoned, and in disgrace at court, the Duchess betook herself to religion. She accompanied her husband to his government at Rouen, and devoted herself to good works. She took for her spiritual director the Abbé Antoine Singlin (1607–1664), famous in the history of Port-Royal. She chiefly lived in Normandy until 1663, when her husband died, and she came to Paris.

There she became more and more Jansenist in opinion, and her piety and the remembrance of her influence during the disastrous days of the Fronde, and above all the love her brother, the great Condé, bore her, made her conspicuous. The king pardoned her and in every way showed respect for her. She became the great protectress of the Jansenists; it was in her house that Antoine Arnauld, Pierre Nicole and Noël Lalane, author of De la Grâce victorieuse, were protected; and to her influence must be in great part attributed the release of Louis-Isaac Lemaistre de Sacy, from the Bastille, the introduction of Simon Arnauld, marquis de Pomponne into the ministry and of Arnauld to the king.

Her famous letters to the pope are part of the history of Port-Royal, and as long as she lived the nuns of Port-Royal des Champs were left in safety. Her elder son resigned his title and estates, and became a Jesuit under the name of the Abbé d'Orléans, while the younger, after leading a debauched life, was killed leading the attack in the passage of the Rhine on June 12th 1672.

As her health failed, she hardly ever left the convent of the Carmelites in which she had been educated. On her death in 1679, she was buried with great splendor by her brother Condé, and her heart, as she had directed, was sent to the nuns of the Port-Royal des Champs.

Authorities on the Duchess
The chief authority for Madame de Longueville's life is a little book in two volumes by Villefore the Jansenist, published in 1738. Victor Cousin has devoted four volumes to her, which, though immensely diffuse, give a vivid picture of her time. See also Sainte-Beuve, Portraits des femmes (1840). Her connection with Port-Royal should be studied in Arnauld's Memoirs, and in the different histories of that institution.

Children
Charlotte Louise, Mademoiselle de Dunois (1645–1664). 
Jean Louis Charles d'Orléans, Duke of Longueville (1646–1694). 
Marie Gabrielle (1646–1650).
Charles Paris d'Orléans, Duke of Longueville (1649–1672).

Ancestry

References

1619 births
1679 deaths
Burials at the Carmel du faubourg Saint-Jacques
Princesses of Neuchâtel
Anne Genevieve
Anne Genevieve
17th-century French women
Duchesses of Longueville
People of the Fronde